Stefan Marković (born 22 July 1993) is a Serbian football defender, playing for Novi Pazar.

References

External links
 
 Stefan Marković stats at utakmica.rs

1993 births
Living people
Sportspeople from Pristina
Serbian footballers
Association football defenders
FK Radnički Niš players
FK Car Konstantin players
FK Moravac Mrštane players
FK Radnički Pirot players
Serbian First League players
Serbian SuperLiga players